Ctenisis is a genus of ant-loving beetles in the family Staphylinidae. There are at least two described species in Ctenisis.

Species
These two species belong to the genus Ctenisis:
 Ctenisis phylanderi Chandler, 2003
 Ctenisis raffrayi Casey, 1894

References

Further reading

 
 
 

Pselaphitae
Articles created by Qbugbot